Tarhan Tower Airlines was a charter airline based in Istanbul, Turkey. Its main hub was Atatürk International Airport.
During December 2007 SHGM (Turkish Civil Aviation authority) suspended the licence allowing the airline to operate due to issues found within the airlines maintenance department.

Services

Tarhan Tower Airlines operated the following services (at December 2006):

Domestic destinations
Adana
Ankara
Antalya
Istanbul Atatürk
İzmir
Kayseri

International destinations
Germany
Stuttgart
Iraq
Erbil
Belgium
Brussels
Israel
Tel Aviv
Armenia
Yerevan
Iran
Tehran
France
Paris
Italy
Bari
Milan
Naples
The Netherlands
Amsterdam

External links 

Tarhan Tower Airlines
Tarhan Tower Airlines fleet

Defunct airlines of Turkey
Airlines established in 2006
Airlines established in 2007
Defunct charter airlines of Turkey